2013 Yokohama F. Marinos season.

J1 League

References

External links
 J.League official site

Yokohama F. Marinos
Yokohama F. Marinos seasons